"Portrait of a Murderer" was an American television play broadcast on February 27, 1958, as part of the second season of the CBS television series Playhouse 90. Leslie Stevens wrote the teleplay, as an adaptation of a story by Abby Mann. Arthur Penn directed, Martin Manulis produced, and Dominick Dunne was an assistant to the producer. Tab Hunter and Geraldine Page starred. Hunter received an Emmy nomination for his performance.

Tab Hunter played the killer Donald Bashor. Leslie Stevens wrote the script with the assistance of a former cell mate of Bashor's; he also wrote while listening to interviews with Bashor.

Plot
A respected man, Donald Bashor, commits a robbery and is suspected of two recent murders.

Cast
The following performers received screen credit for their performances:

 Tab Hunter – Donald Bashor
 Geraldine Page – Florry
 Rudy Bond – Eddie
 Elizabeth Patterson – Mrs. Finch
 Frank London – Jackie
 Ned Glass – Charlie
 Barbara Turner – Sandra
 Sid Clute – Mr. Cooney
 Richard Bisutti – Bobby
 Donald Foster – Psychiatrist
 Joe Perry – Records Officer
 Almira Sessions – Murdered Woman
 Edwin Jerome – Judge
 Jules Maitland – Interviewer
 Joe A. Mayo – Policeman
 Glenn Turnbull – Policeman
 Bill Boyett – Policeman 
 Gary Walberg – Policemen

Reception
The Los Angeles Times thought it was "extremely interesting TV."

The AV Club says the director Arthur Penn "makes extensive use of Bashor's actual statements and a first-person camera to create a faux-documentary style that was decades ahead of its time. Penn marveled at the improvisatory aspect of Tab Hunter's performance as Bashor, citing an unplanned moment in which Hunter stops to pick up a basket of spilled laundry just after his character has committed murder. It was a textbook case of how the immediacy of live television was meant to work."

Ray Stark wanted to make a film version directed by Stevens with Hunter reprising his role, but it was never made.

References

External links
Portrait of a Murderer at IMDb

1958 television plays
1958 American television episodes
Playhouse 90 (season 2) episodes